The Estadio Cuscatlán is a football stadium located in the city of San Salvador, El Salvador. It was inaugurated in 1976. It can hold 53,400 spectators, making it the stadium with the largest spectator capacity in Central America and the Caribbean. The stadium has undergone several renovations, including in 1997; 2007; 2008; 2015, with the change of colors alluding to the country's flag (blue and white); and the most recent in 2020, with the installation of a new screen 100m² 4K LED and 54 new 1,500-watt metal halide luminaires with a capacity of 1,000 luxes, and an automated irrigation system.

History
Cuscatlán stadium was first developed as a replacement to what at the time was El Salvador's largest stadium, Estadio Nacional de la Flor Blanca (now known as Estadio Jorge "Mágico" González). Its creation was made possible by EDESSA (Estadios Deportivos de El Salvador) who in 1969 first proposed the idea of a new national stadium.

Construction began on 24 March 1971, with then-president of El Salvador General Fidel Sánchez Hernández laying the first stone. After 5 years of building, the stadium was opened and held its first game on 24 July 1976. This day saw German Bundesliga champions Borussia Mönchengladbach play the El Salvador national team, with the match ending 2–0 to the German side.

On 25 May 1978, EDESSA agreed to and signed a 599-year lease of the stadium to CLIMA (Asociación de Clubes de Liga Mayor A'). As a result, CLIMA is now the operator of the stadium, and controls what events are held there.

The stadium

The stadium, with a capacity of 53,400 is the largest football venue in  El Salvador and Central America.

It was announced on 16 November 2007 that Estadio Cuscatlán would become the first football stadium in Central America and Caribbean to have a large LED screen where the supporters can view the action. The screen is 40 meters in height and width and was completed in March 2008.

The modernization also extends to the pitch, which includes:

 French drainage system to allow water to flow off the grounds when it rains excessively
 6 sprinkler systems to self water the grounds
 Dugouts for both home and away teams, each with its own lavatory
 Imported high quality grass
 Various V.I.P. boxes

Facilities and capacity
The stadium's capacity has been the topic of much dispute, with many saying that its official capacity is not accurate. As the stadium only has seats available in certain sections, it is difficult to estimate the maximum capacity when determining how many spectators could fit into the sections without seats. The seating capacity is estimated to be between 45,000 and 53,400 people. FIFA regulates the capacity, setting a maximum of about 45,000.

The stadium has the following distribution on its premises:

Cuscatlán Stadium is the only stadium nationwide that meets FIFA requirements for international matches.

The grounds
The stadium itself sits on an area of land roughly 15 square blocks (30 hectares) in size. Not only does it accommodate the stadium itself, with its parking lot (8,500 cars capacity), but also two other football pitches. One of these is used for training by club sides to limit damage to the stadium ground itself. The other ground is used for junior football.

Events
Although Cuscatlán Stadium was primarily built to be just a football stadium, it is also used for other events. Apart from football, it is used for concerts, cultural events, religious events, and political rallies. In 2005, Colgate broke the World Record of most people brushing their teeth at the same time in this stadium.

 El Salvador national football team
 FIFA World Cup qualification
 UNCAF Nations Cup 1995–2007

See also
List of stadiums in Central America and the Caribbean

References

External links

Football venues in San Salvador
Alianza F.C.